Morton Park is a park in Plymouth, Massachusetts, located west of Route 3 and northwest of Lout Pond with its main entrance off Summer Street and its rear entrance off Billington Street.

External links
Town of Plymouth Parks, Playgrounds and Beaches
The Outdoor Network for Plymouth

Plymouth, Massachusetts